Leptotrombidium deliense is a species of mite.

It is a vector and reservoir for scrub typhus.

See also 
 List of mites associated with cutaneous reactions

References

Arachnids of Asia
Trombiculidae